Setolu (also Romanized as Setolū, Satloo, Satlū, and Sotolū; also known as Seh Tolū and Setowlū) is a village in Kushk-e Nar Rural District, Kushk-e Nar District, Parsian County, Hormozgan Province, Iran. At the 2006 census, its population was 1,376, in 271 families.

References 

Populated places in Parsian County